Bertha is an unincorporated community in Dale County, Alabama, United States.

History
Bertha is likely named in honor of the daughter of the post master. A post office operated under the name Bertha from 1891 to 1904.

Bertha Pig Roast 
Bertha is also the site of an annual food, music, and entertainment festival known as the "Bertha Pig Roast."  Held each March, the event began as a small cookout in 1996, but it has grown into a weekend-long extravaganza featuring the local food, music, art, and history of the Bertha community.

References

Unincorporated communities in Dale County, Alabama
Unincorporated communities in Alabama